Glenn Holm may refer to:

Glenn Holm (Swedish footballer) (born 1955)
Glenn Holm (Norwegian footballer) (born 1969)